Steinar Raknes (born 22 March 1975) is a Norwegian jazz musician (upright bass) and composer, and the younger brother of Jazz singer and pianist Eldbjørg Raknes. He is considered to be one of the most talented double bass players of his generation in Norway, and is known from collaborations with the like of Chick Corea, Michael Brecker, Bobby McFerrin, Ola Kvernberg and Hallgeir Pedersen.

Career
Raknes was born in Midsund.  He started to play bass at the age fifteen, graduated from the Music school in Kristiansund 1994, and from the "Sund Folkehøgskole" 1995. As a student on the Jazz program at Trondheim Musikkonservatorium (1995–98) he established the bands The Core and Urban Connection (bouth in 1996). He played with the Trondheim Jazz Orchestra featuring Chick Corea as soloist, and the quartet "BounceTones". He contributed to the cooperated broadcast NRK/EBU "Jazz jorda rundt" as the bassist within the Hallgeir Pedersen Trio 2003.

Raknes has played on releases by Jens Arne Molvær (1998) and Ole Reinlund (2003), and is also steady in the band line up with Ola Kvernberg, played in the Kirsti Huke Trio and initiated Shagma in 2004. In 2008 he debuted as solo artist with the album Tangos, Ballads & More, followed up in 2012 by the album Stillhouse. He has also worked as instrumental double bass teacher on the Jazz program at Trondheim Musikkonservatorium.

Discography

Solo albums 
2008: Tangos, Ballads & More (Park Grammofon), with Ola Kvernberg, John Pål Inderberg & Håkon Mjåset Johansen
2012: Stillhouse (Reckless Records), with Mickey Raphael, Solveig Slettahjell, Unni Wilhelmsen, Kaja Bremnes, Paolo Vinaccia & Andrew Utnem

Collaborative works 

Within Urban Connection
2001: Urban Connection (Bergland Productions)
2002: French Only (Bergland Productions)
2004: UC 3 (Bergland Productions)

With Siri Gjære
Love Seriously Damages Health (2001, Bergland Prod.)

Within The Core
2004: Vision – (Jazzaway Records)
2006: Blue Sky – (Jazzaway Records)
2007: Office Essentials – (Jazzland Recordings)
2010: Party – (Moserobie Music)

Within "Shagma"
2005:Music – (Jazzaway Records)

Within Trondheim Jazz Orchestra
2005: Live in Molde – (MNJ Records), feat. Chick Corea

Within Ola Kvernberg Trio
2006: Night//Driver – (Jazzland Recordings)
2009: Folk – (Jazzland Recordings)

Within The Indian Core
2007: The Indian Core – (Grappa Music)

With Kirsti Huke
2007: Deloo – (Grappa Music)
2009: Kirsti Huke – (Fairplay)

With The Bergen Big Band
2007: Meditations on Coltrane – (Grappa Music), feat. The Core

With Håvard Lund
2010: My Sister Said – (Turn Left Prod.)

References

External links

Ola Kvernberg Trio – Sardinen USF November 16, 2012, Bergen Jazzforum on YouTube

1975 births
Living people
Norwegian University of Science and Technology alumni
Norwegian jazz upright-bassists
Male double-bassists
Jazz double-bassists
Norwegian jazz composers
Musicians from Midsund
21st-century double-bassists
21st-century Norwegian male musicians
Ensemble Denada members
The Core (band) members
Trondheim Jazz Orchestra members
Ola Kvernberg Trio members
Urban Connection members